Drolling is an archaic term for the act of playing the fool. 

It is also a surname.

People with surname Drolling
 Michel Martin Drolling (1789–1851), French painter 
 Martin Drolling (1752–1817), French painter, father of Michel